The Riverina is a broad region of south-central New South Wales. It may also refer to:

Places
 Riverina wine region, with a legal definition smaller than the common use of the term "Riverina"
 Division of Riverina, electoral district for the parliament of Australia
 Riverina Plains Important Bird Area, grassland near the Murrumbidgee River
 Riverina Highway, in Riverina, NSW, AUS
 Anglican Diocese of Riverina

Other uses
 Riverina Football Netball League, a competition for Australian Rules football and netball
 Riverina Anglican College, a co-ed secondary day school
 Riverina Institute, a training institute

See also

 Division of Riverina-Darling, a former electoral district of Australia
 Riverina Movement, a separatist movement in Riverina to secede into a new state from NSW